Cat Allman was a Program Manager in the Open Source Outreach and Making & Science teams at Google and Google lead of Science Foo Camp.

Career 
Allman has been involved in open source software since the 1980s. She worked with the global Free and open-source software community at Google. She worked on Google Summer of Code and Google Code-in. As well as developing programming skills, she is interested in the interpersonal aspects of engineering. She is on the board of directors at USENIX. She served as a jury member for Falling Walls.

References 

Google employees
Living people
Year of birth missing (living people)